Lin Xiaojun, born Lim Hyo-jun (born 29 May 1996), is a South Korean-born Chinese short track speed skater. He is the 2018 champion of the Men's 1500 m event in short track speed skating at the Winter Olympics, and also set the new Olympic record for the event. Originally starting as a swimmer, Lim took up skating at a young age. Despite multiple injuries early on in his career, he notably won gold at the 2012 Winter Youth Olympics upon his international debut in the Boys' 1000 m event. He would later win the 1000 m and 1500 m events in the Budapest leg of the 2017–18 ISU Short Track Speed Skating World Cup and earn selection for the 2018 Winter Olympics in Pyeongchang. Upon his Olympic debut, Lim won the gold medal, setting a new Olympic record of 2:10.485 in the process, beating Lee Jung-su's previous record set at the 2010 games.

Career

2012–2019: South Korea representation

Early years, Winter Youth Olympics 
Lim Hyo-jun started competing as a swimmer, but later switched to short track speed skating after suffering damage to his tympanum. During his early career during middle school, he underwent seven surgeries after many injuries sustained during competitions caused numerous hiatuses, including a period in which Lim did not compete for a year, following a leg injury. During his early career, Lim represented South Korea in his first international competition at the 2012 Winter Youth Olympics in Innsbruck. There, he won the gold medal on his debut in the Boys' 1000 m event, and the silver medal behind fellow South Korean Yoon Su-min in the Boys' 500 m event. In the unique Mixed team relay event, where athletes of different countries and sexes competed together, Lim's "Team H" reached the gold medal final, but ultimately did not place after they were penalised for dropping the baton during the race.

Universiade, World Cup, Winter Olympics 
After a four-year absence from international competition, Lim returned during the 2017 Winter Universiade in Almaty, once again representing South Korea. He competed in the Men's 500 m event, where he reached the final following respective first and second-place finishes in the heats and quarterfinals, and the disqualification of Kazakhstan's Nurbergen Zhumagaziyev for obstructing Lim in the semifinal. In the final, however, Lim failed to make a podium finish, placing fourth behind South Korea's Kim Do-kyoum and Kazakhstan's Abzal Azhgaliyev and Denis Nikisha. In the Men's 5000 m relay event, the South Korean team, which initially didn't include Lim due to his occupation with the 500 m event the same day of the semifinal, were successful in qualifying for the final. Lim was chosen to replace Lee Mun-hyeon for the final race the next day, though they were ultimately unsuccessful, conceding a penalty in a performance that would've otherwise saw them place third.

Prior to his debut at the 2018 Winter Olympics, Lim won the 1000 m and 1500 m events at the September 2017 Budapest leg of the 2017–18 ISU Short Track Speed Skating World Cup, where he placed ahead of fellow South Korean skater Hwang Dae-heon both times. In the same leg, Lim also placed second in the 500m event ahead of Hwang and behind Hungary's Sándor Liu Shaolin. Lim continued on to the Seoul leg of the World Cup in November, where he was relatively less successful, reaching only the placement final in the 500 m event, and being disqualified in the 1000 m event following a collision with Russia's Alexander Shulginov in the quarterfinal. Lim reached the gold medal final of the 1500 m event, but was also similarly disqualified. He solely found success during the Seoul leg through the South Korean 5000 m relay team, alongside Seo Yi-ra, Kwak Yoon-gy, and Kim Do-kyoum, placing second in their heat and semifinal, before winning the final race.

At the 2018 Winter Olympics, Lim Hyo-jun competed in the Men's 1500 m event, and is due to compete as part of the Korean team for the Men's 5000 m relay. In the heats of the individual 1500 m event, Lim placed first in a race that saw Japan's Kazuki Yoshinaga disqualified after a stumble; Hungary's Shaoang Liu, who placed fourth, qualified with Lim to the semifinals. In the semifinals, Lim again placed first along with fellow Korean Hwang Dae-heon, who placed second behind him. In the gold medal final, Canada's Charles Hamelin collided with Hwang with three laps left in the race, leaving Lim the last Korean in the field. He nevertheless finished the race seven hundredths of a second ahead of the Netherlands' Sjinkie Knegt, the World record holder, to claim the gold medal in the event; the third time in the event's history that a South Korean had placed first. Lim also claimed the Olympic record for the event, recording a time of 2:10.485 in the final, beating Lee Jung-su's record of 2:10.949 set at the 2010 Winter Olympics in Vancouver.

In 2020, Lim was convicted of sexual harassment after pulling down another male athlete's pants in front of female teammates in 2019. Following the conviction, Lim was banned from competing for the South Korean national team. The conviction was overturned when he was later found not guilty by the appellate court, which the Supreme Court of Korea affirmed in June 2021. It was found that the purported male victim was behaving aggressively toward the women present, and that Lim's pulling of his pants happened in a playful circumstance where everyone was fooling around.

2021–present: China representation 
After not being able to continue his career in South Korea due to the now-overturned sexual harassment charges, in March 2021, at the invitation of the Chinese Skating Association, Lim applied for Chinese citizenship in order to represent China at the 2022 Beijing Winter Olympics. However, immediate reappearance at the 2022 Olympics required an agreement with Korean Skating Union (KSU) to waive the 3-year transfer waiting period. The International Skating Union eventually cleared the transfer in July 2022, after the Winter Olympics was over.

Making his debut representation under his Chinese name, Lin Xiaojun, at 2022–23 ISU Short Track Speed Skating World Cup, he was injured at the Montreal leg while competing in the mixed team relay and had to pulled out from subsequent events at the Montreal leg. He was not on the roster for the Salt Lake leg due to the injury.

At the 5th event of 2022-23 ISU World Cup, Lin Xiaojun won his first gold medal, as a Chinese, in the 500m discipline; and later won his second gold medal along with his teammates in the 5000m men's relay disciple. 

At the 6th event of 2022-23 ISU World Cup, Lin Xiaojun won another gold medal in the 500m discipline, and a silver medal in the 5000m men relay discipline. After a strong comeback, Lin posted on social media sites Weibo, Xiaohongshu and Instagram mentioning that he will "work harder to come back better", for the 2023 Short track speed skating world championships scheduled to be held in Seoul, South Korea. 

In the 2023 World Short Track Speed Skating Championships, Lin won the gold medal in the 5000m men relay and a silver medal in the 2000 mixed relay, along with his teammates.

Statistics

Personal Bests

Winter Olympics

See also
List of Olympic medalists in short track speed skating
List of Youth Olympic Games gold medalists who won Olympic gold medals

Notes

References

External links

Pyeongchang 2018 profile (Archived )
ShorttrackOnLine profile

1996 births
Living people
Chinese male short track speed skaters
Naturalized citizens of the People's Republic of China
Olympic gold medalists for South Korea
Olympic bronze medalists for South Korea
Olympic medalists in short track speed skating
Olympic short track speed skaters of South Korea
Short track speed skaters at the 2018 Winter Olympics
Medalists at the 2018 Winter Olympics
World Short Track Speed Skating Championships medalists
Sportspeople from Daegu
Short track speed skaters at the 2012 Winter Youth Olympics
Youth Olympic gold medalists for South Korea
Chinese people of Korean descent
Competitors at the 2017 Winter Universiade